Čekmin is a populated place in the town of Leskovac in the Jablanica district. According to the 2011 census, there were 820 inhabitants in 242 households (according to the 2002 census there were 915 inhabitants). The village of Čekmin is located on the eastern protrusion of the Dobra Glava hills and the western edge of the Leskovac field. A stream flows through the village, which the locals call the Chekmin's river, and which is a left tributary of the South Morava. The village is well connected by roads with the regional road Nis-Leskovac. It is 16 kilometers away from Leskovac. The most important activity of the population is agriculture, primarily the production of potatoes and peppers, but also other vegetable crops, as well as fruit growing and viticulture. In addition to arable land, the area of the village of Čekmin also has a large area under forests. In Čekmin, the earth is being excavated for the needs of the production of construction materials. The village celebration, which in this part of the country is called "litija", is White Friday, an Orthodox Christian holiday that changes the date and falls on the first Friday after Trinity.

History 
Čekmin is one of the oldest inhabited places in the Leskovac area, as evidenced by the remains of former settlements in several localities in the immediate vicinity of today's village, as well as the names of those localities themselves. Traces dating from the Neolithic period, i.e. the Late Stone Age, were found at the "Kućište" and "Selište" sites. The first written trace of the village of Čekmin can still be found only in the Turkish census books from the 15th century. There are several opinions about the origin of the name of the village. One of them is related to the legend that on the place of today's village there were once hunting lodges, for hunting small and large game, so that the name of the place is actually a coin abbreviation "check" and "min", from the word wait and minute . In the village of Čekmin, there used to be a church dedicated to Saint Elijah, destroyed during the Turks. By the way, the village was liberated from the Turks on December 21, 1877. years. The inhabitants of Čekmin were participants in the Balkan Wars, the First and Second World Wars. Čekmin was released in the First World War on October 7, 1918. year, and in the Second World War 12.10.1944. years. A large number of inhabitants also took part in the wars in the last decade of the 20th century. It is interesting that King Milan Obrenović also stayed in the area of the village of Čekmin for hunting. Čekmin also mentions Đuro Daničić in his work "Serbian Accents", in the discussion on the manner of accentuating the name of the village.

Education, sports and culture 
A four-grade elementary school operates in the well, which functions as a separate department of the elementary school "Vuk Karadzić" from Pečenjevce. By the way, the first school in the village of Čekmin started working on the day of Saint Sava, January 27, 1935. years. The school initially worked as a separate department of the primary school in Pečenjevce, but by the decision of the Ministry of Education of the Kingdom of Yugoslavia in 1940, due to the large number of students, it grew into an independent state school called "Petar Kočić". by the German soldiers, which led to the construction of a new school building after the war. The new school was built in 1948 and was used until 1992. Since 1992, a modern school building has been in use.

There is a football club of the same name in Čekmin, FC Čekmin, which is in the 2012/2013 season. competes in the Jablanica District League. The football club was founded in 1947 under the name FK Proleter, and from 1965 to 1998 it was called FK Pobeda. In 1965, the Cultural and Artistic Association "Čekmin" was founded in the village, which recorded enviable successes during its work. Čekminski atar is known as a quality hunting ground, which is managed by the Hunting Association Dobra Glava with its headquarters in Pečenjevce, which is why a significant number of locals are engaged in hunting.

Demographics 
In recent decades, there has been a trend of emigration of the population to the surrounding and other cities in Serbia, as well as abroad.

References

Populated places in Jablanica District